Pterolophia alboantennata is a species of beetle in the family Cerambycidae. It was described by Stephan von Breuning in 1938. It is known from Burma and Borneo.

References

alboantennata
Beetles described in 1938